Kaare Dybvad Bek (born 5 August 1984) is a Danish politician, who is a member of the Folketing for the Social Democrats political party. He was elected into parliament at the 2015 Danish general election. He has been the Minister for Immigration and Integration since 2022, the Minister for Building and Housing from 2019 to 2022 and Minister of the Interior from 2021 to 2022.

Dybvad was born in Holbæk to Jens Juul Dybvad Olesen and Dorte Simonsen, and is married to Maiken Bek.

Political career
He was elected member of Folketinget for the Social Democrats from 2015. He was appointed Minister for Building and Housing in the Frederiksen Cabinet from 27 June 2019. In a reshuffle on 21 January 2021 Dybvad also became the Minister of the Interior.

References

1984 births
Living people
People from Holbæk Municipality
Government ministers of Denmark
Social Democrats (Denmark) politicians
Members of the Folketing 2015–2019
Members of the Folketing 2019–2022
Members of the Folketing 2022–2026